The FP3 Player was a digital audio player designed for preschool children, made by Fisher-Price from 2006–2007. It had some of the functionality of "grown-up" players including an online store with music and story downloads. It was built with a rugged body, had large buttons, and displayed a visual icon for each song. According to CNET the device was not compatible with Mac computers. CNET also said that "the foam earpieces come off too easily," and that it was "pretty pricey for a 128 MB player."

References

External links
 Official FP3 page from Fisher-Price.com

Fisher-Price